Enzo Boulom (born 29 January 1997) is a French motorcycle racer. He currently competes in the French Supersport Championship aboard a Yamaha YZF-R6. Boulom has been a competitor in the FIM CEV Moto3 Junior World Championship, the French 125cc/Moto3 Championship, and the Red Bull MotoGP Rookies Cup in 2014 and 2015.

Career statistics

Grand Prix motorcycle racing

By season

Races by year

References

External links

1997 births
Living people
French motorcycle racers
Moto3 World Championship riders